Mama Loves Papa is a 1945 American black-and-white comedy film directed by Frank R. Strayer, and written by Monte Brice, with a story by Keene Thompson and a screenplay by Charles E. Roberts, as a loose remake of the 1933 film Mama Loves Papa, written by Douglas MacLean.  The film was produced by RKO Radio Pictures and stars Leon Errol and Elizabeth Risdon.

Background
RKO bought the film rights to Paramount's 1933 film for $85,000.  Two actors who had been in the 1933 version of this film, returned to this 1945 remake in different roles.  Tom McGuire who had earlier played the character of O'Leary, returned as the Chief of Police, and Ruth Warren who had earlier played the role of Sara Walker, returned as Mabel.

Plot
Wilbur (Leon Errol) is a middle-class furniture store employee.  His wife Jessie (Elisabeth Risdon) reads a book about how women can make their men more successful, and decides to remake her husband to give him a new image.  Now dressed-for-success by his wife, Wilbur reports for work in fancy clothes.  Thinking he is dressed for a funeral, his boss (Edwin Maxwell), sends Wilbur home for the day.  When Wilbur is wandering perplexed in a nearby park, he is mistaken for the Park Commissioner.  Seeing it as an opportunity, McIntosh (Paul Harvey), a crooked politician who wishes to land a lucrative deal with the city to sell them new playground equipment, has the mayor (Robert Middlemass) appoint Wilbur as "Playground Commissioner".  Later, when Wilbur is about to denounce McIntosh as a crook, McIntosh has his wife (Charlotte Wynters) ply Wilbur with champagne.  While Wilbur is tipsy, Jessie overhears a flirtatious and damning conversation between the two.  Wilbur wakes up with a hangover, no pants, and learns that while intoxicated he brought disgrace to himself, the town, and his wife.  Wilbur eventually exposes the political corruption, and when his wife finally agrees to let him leave politics, everything turns out okay.

Partial cast
 Leon Errol as Wilbur Todd 
 Elisabeth Risdon as Jessie Todd 
 Edwin Maxwell as Kirkwood 
 Emory Parnell as O'Leary 
 Charles Halton as Appleby 
 Paul Harvey as Mr. McIntosh 
 Charlotte Wynters as Mrs. McIntosh 
 Ruth Lee as Mabel 
 Lawrence Tierney as Sharpe 
Additional characters 
 Florence Auer as Madame Dalba  
 Tom Chatterton as Speaker   
 Charlie Hall as Bartender 
 Tom McGuire as Chief of Police 
 Jack Richardson as Gentleman  
 Jason Robards Sr. as Playground Policeman  
 Robert Middlemass as The Mayor 
 Don Douglas as Secretary 
 Max Wagner as City Official 
 Frank O'Connor as City Official

Critical reception
Waycross Journal-Herald wrote that the film was the "hilarious results of domesticity gone wild".  Conversely, TV Guide wrote that when RKO bought the rights to Paramount's 1933 film for $85,000, they ended up creating "a film worth about $5".  Hal Erickson of Rovi wrote that with a change in plot devices and modification of script, the film was only a "loose remake of the 1935 Charlie Ruggles-Mary Boland comedy of the same name," and notes the sole redeeming feature to be Leon Errol's "rubber legs" routine already familiar to his fans.

References

External links
 
 

1945 films
American comedy films
1940s English-language films
RKO Pictures films
American black-and-white films
Films directed by Frank R. Strayer
Films scored by Leigh Harline
1945 comedy films
1940s American films